Ilovica is a village in the municipality of Bosilovo, North Macedonia.

Demographics 
According to the national census of 2002, the village had a total of 1,907 inhabitants. Ethnic groups in the municipality include:
 Macedonians : 1 611
 Turks : 239
 Romanis : 19
 Serbs : 1
 Others : 37

References

External links

Villages in Bosilovo Municipality